Xylokera is a village in the municipal unit of Iardanos, Elis, Greece. In 2011, it had a population of 319. It is 1 km west of Vounargo, 2 km east of Alpochori and 8 km northwest of Pyrgos.

Population

See also

List of settlements in Elis

External links
Xylokera at the GTP Travel Pages

References

Iardanos
Populated places in Elis